The 2014 Vanderbilt Commodores baseball team represented Vanderbilt University in the 2014 NCAA Division I baseball season.  The team played its home games at Hawkins Field in Nashville, Tennessee.  The team was coached by Tim Corbin in his twelfth season at Vanderbilt.

The Commodores won the 2014 College World Series, defeating the Virginia Cavaliers 2 games to 1 in the championship series. It was the first NCAA men's championship in school history.

Personnel

Roster

Coaches

Schedule

Ranking Movements

References

Vanderbilt
Vanderbilt Commodores baseball seasons
College World Series seasons
NCAA Division I Baseball Championship seasons
Vanderbilt
Vanderbilt Commodores baseball